Èṣù is an Òrìṣà/Irúnmọlẹ̀ in the ìṣẹ̀ṣe religion of the Yoruba people. Èṣù is a prominent primordial Divinity (a delegated Irúnmọlẹ̀ sent by the Olódùmarè) who descended from Ìkọ̀lé Ọ̀run, and the Chief Enforcer of natural and divine laws - he is the Deity in charge of law enforcement and orderliness. As the religion has spread around the world, the name of this Orisha has varied in different locations, but the beliefs remain similar.

Brief 
The other names of the Irúnmọlẹ̀ called Èṣù includes Ẹlẹ́jẹ̀lú, Olúlànà, Ọbasìn, Láarúmọ̀, Ajọ́ńgọ́lọ̀, Ọba Ọ̀dàrà, Onílé Oríta, Ẹlẹ́gbára Ọ̀gọ, Olóògùn Àjíṣà, Láàlú Ògiri Òkò, Láàlù Bara Ẹlẹ́jọ́, Láaróyè Ẹbọra tí jẹ́ Látọpa.

Èṣù is powerful, relevant, and ubiquitous to the extent of having every day of the four-day (ancient/traditional) Yorùbá week as his day of worship (Ọjọ́ Ọ̀ṣẹ̀), unlike all other Irúnmọlẹ̀s and Òrìṣàs (primordial Divinities and deified Ancestor Spirits; "ọjọ́ gbogbo ni ti Èṣù Ọ̀darà".

The controversial cognomen; A-bá-ni-wá-ọ̀ràn-bá-ò-rí-dá (He-who-creates-problems-for-the-innocent) highlights the complexity of the nature of this highly unpredictable Deity called Èṣù Ọba Ọ̀dàrà (who has his abode at crossroads) across all strata of Yorùbá society in general and of spiritual communities in particular.

Èṣù is a personification of Mischief; he is the one who teaches that there are always two sides or more to every issue. He balanced and created directions. That is why it is believed that Èṣù is so necessary to have an ordered life.

According to Oluwo Aderemi Ifaoleepin Aderemi from Oyo Alaafin, to the criminally minded who celebrate wickedness, injustice, and immorality and unrighteous people, Èṣù Láàlù is evil and devilish, whilst Láaróyè Ajọ́ńgọ́lọ̀ Ọkùnrin Òde is an awesome and persuasive Divinity to pious and morally upright people who place a premium on justice, morality, and good character.

Èṣù is the messenger not only to the Olódùmarè, but also to the other Irúnmọlẹ̀s/Òrìṣàs. He is also the intermediary between Ajoguns (evil spirits) to the Irúnmọlẹ̀s/Òrìṣàs and the ẹ̀dá èèyàn (human beings); he is the one who distributes, and also supervises the distribution of sacrifices (ẹbọ) to the Ajoguns.

Name and role
Èṣùu partially serves as an alternate name for Eleggua, the messenger for all Orishas, and that there are 256 paths to Eleggua—each one of which is an Eshu. It is believed that Èṣù of the ìṣẹ̀ṣe Religion is an Òrìṣà similar to Eleggua, but there are only 101 paths to Eshu according to ocha, rather than the 256 paths to Eleggua according to Ifá. Èṣù is known as the "Father who gave birth to Ogboni", and is also thought to be agile and always willing to rise to a challenge.

Both ocha and Ifá share some paths, however. Eshu Ayé is said to work closely with all Òrìṣà including Òrìṣà Olokun and is thought to walk on the shore of the beach. Èṣù Bi is a stern and forceful avatar, appearing as both an old man and young boy, who walked with Shangó and Oyá (the initial two Ibeyi), and Eshu Bi protects both of these, as well as all other small children. Eshu Laroye is an avatar believed to be the companion of Oshún and believed to be one of the most important Eshus, and the avatar of Eshu Laroye is thought to be talkative and small.

Èṣù is always at the middle of divergent world forces. He controls and regulates the two extremes - the world of happiness, joy, and fulfilment, as well as the arena of destruction, hopelessness, and sorrow.

Èṣù always demands from those who have to give to those demanded for it within the premises of sacrifices, rituals, and propitiation.
He maintains the delicate balance of good and bad - just and unjust. He protects towns and villages, Priests and Priestess (àwọn Ẹlẹ́gùn - tí wọ́n ní ẹ̀rẹ́ ní Ìpàkọ́, and Devotees and Awos against evil machinations. And he always favours those that performed the necessary and appropriate sacrifices (ẹbọs) and other forms of rituals; "ẹni tó bá rúbọ l'Èṣù ń gbè"! 

Èṣù Láàlù is a bosom friend, working partner, confidant, and close associate of Ọ̀rúnmìlà Baraà mi Àgbọnnìrègún, the one who practises and teaches Ifá - an esoteric language of Olódùmarè (containing divine message of life) through a very complex divinatory system, and who also teaches wisdom.

Other names
The name of Eshu varies around the world: in Yorùbáland, Eshu is Èṣù-Elegba or Laolu-Ogiri Oko; Exu de Candomblé in Candomblé; Echú in Santería and Latin America; Legba in Haitian Vodou; Leba in Winti; Exu de Quimbanda in Quimbanda; Lubaniba in Palo Mayombe; and Exu in Latin America.

Brazil
Exu is known by various forms and names in Afro-Brazilian religions. They include Akessan; Alafiá; Alaketo; Bará, or Ibará; Elegbá, or Elegbará, Inan; Lalu, or Jelu; Laroiê; Lon Bií; Lonã; Odara; Olodé; Tamenta, or Etamitá; Tlriri. The most common forms or praise-names of Exu are Exu-Agbo, the protector and guardian of houses and terreiros; Exu-Elepô, the god of palm oil; Exu lnã, the god of fire; and Exu Ojixé, a  messenger god.

Candomblé
A shrine dedicated to Exu is located outside of the main terreiro of a Candomblé temple, usually near the entrance gate. It is, in general, made of a simple mound of red clay. These shrines are similar to those found in Nigeria.

Ritual foods offered to Exu include palm oil; beans; corn, either in the form of cornmeal or popcorn; and farofa, a manioc flour. Four-legged male birds and other animals are offered as sacrifice to Exu. In each offering made to an orixá, a part of the food is separated and dedicated to Exu.

Umbanda
In the Syncretic religion of Umbanda, Exu may have a different meaning. Usually in Umbanda Exu is not considered a single Deity, but many different spirits. Some of the most popular versions of Exu are Exu Caveira ("Skull Exu", represented as a skeleton), Exu Tranca-Rua ("Street Locker", opener and closer of spiritual ways) and Exu Mirim ("Little Exu", a spirit that resembles the personality of a child or teenager). In Umbanda, a Pombagira (female consort of Exu) may also be considered a kind of Exu, commonly venerated in the practice of Brazilian Love magic.

Controversy on English translations and on Google
From the time of the first English translations of Yorùbá words in the mid nineteenth century, Èṣù has been rendered as "devil" or "satan". The first known instance of this came from Samuel Ajayi Crowther's "Vocabulary of the Yoruba" (1842) where his entries for "Satan" and “devil” had Eshu in English. Subsequent dictionaries over the years have followed suit, permeating popular culture and Yorùbá societies as well. Lately, many online campaigns have been set up to protest this, and many activists have worked to correct it. There have also been quite a number of academic work examining the mistranslation.

The translation on Google Translate took up the same earlier mistranslations. This led to a number of online campaigns until 2016 when Nigerian linguist and writer Kola Tubosun, then an employee at Google, first changed it back to less derogatory connotations. When the changes were reverted, he changed them again in 2019. The translation for Èṣù to English now remains "Èṣù" while "devil" and "satan" translate to "bìlísì" and "sàtánì" respectively.

Appearances in popular culture
Eshu appears in K. A. Applegate's fantasy series Everworld, serving as the main antagonist of its eighth book, Brave the Betrayal.  He is a trickster god who tries many times to emotionally manipulate and mentally break the book's narrator, Jalil Sherman, but is ultimately defeated when Jalil proves too strong to give in to his mental tricks and magical illusions.
The 1974 blaxploitation film Abby features Eshu, but mostly as a deranged and ruthless sex deity that possesses a young woman and causes her to sexually assault and brutally murder various men in the process.
 Eshu appears as the main antagonist of the film Scooby-Doo! Ghastly Goals.
 Eshu features in the stage name "Eshu Tune" of rapper and comedian Hannibal Buress

See also
 Elegua

 Kalfu

References

Traditional African religions
Yoruba deities
Yoruba mythology
Brazilian deities
Crossroads mythology
Trickster gods
Santería